is a railway station in the city of Tōkai, Aichi Prefecture, Japan, operated by Meitetsu.

Lines

Station layout
The station has two elevated opposed side platforms, with a station building located underneath. The station has automated ticket machines, Manaca automated turnstiles and is unattended.

Platforms

Adjacent stations

Station history
The Aichi Electric Railway became part of the Meitetsu group on August 1, 1935. The station was renamed to its present name on October 1, 1947. From 1978-1979, the tracks were elevated. In December 2004, the Tranpass system of magnetic fare cards with automatic turnstiles was implemented, and the station has been unattended since that point.

Passenger statistics
In fiscal 2017, the station was used by an average of 5515 passengers daily.

Surrounding area
Japan National Route 247

See also
 List of Railway Stations in Japan

References

External links

  

Railway stations in Japan opened in 1912
Railway stations in Aichi Prefecture
Stations of Nagoya Railroad
Tōkai, Aichi